Ab Chekan (also Romanized as Āb Chekān and Abechkān; also known as Abeshkān and Abjekān) is a village in Damen Rural District, in the Central District of Iranshahr County, Sistan and Baluchestan Province, Iran. At the 2006 census, its population was 511, in 99 families.

References 

Populated places in Iranshahr County